Martin Parlagi (born 26 March 1988) is a Slovak professional boxer.

Amateur career 
Parlagi's amateur record includes about 220 fights with 190 victories. He participated in the World Amateur Boxing Championships in 2007 and 2009, although both times he was eliminated in the round of 32. His best amateur result in a major competition was reaching the quarterfinals of the 2008 European Amateur Boxing Championships. He attempted, but failed, to qualify for the 2008 Summer Olympics.

Professional career 
Parlagi turned professional in 2011. His biggest professional win so far came in 2012 when he defeated Michal Dufek for the vacant Czech lightweight title.

Professional boxing record

References

External links 
Profile at boxrec.com
Profile at profiboxing.cz

Super-featherweight boxers
1988 births
Living people
Slovak male boxers
People from Vranov nad Topľou
Sportspeople from the Prešov Region